Qelich castle is a historical castle located in Esfarayen County in North Khorasan Province, The longevity of this fortress dates back to the Achaemenid Empire and Parthian Empire.

References 

Castles in Iran
Achaemenid castles
Parthian castles